Bodhi Linux is a light-weight Linux distribution based on Ubuntu that uses an Enlightenment DR17-based fork called Moksha. The philosophy for the distribution is to provide a minimal base system so that users can install the software they want. In turn, the distribution only includes software that is essential to most users, such as a file manager (PCManFM), a terminal emulator (Terminology), and a web browser. To install additional software, Bodhi Linux developers maintain a browser based app store that uses apturl to install programs.

Performance 
System requirements include 512MB RAM, 5GB hard disk space, and a 500MHz processor. 32-bit processors without PAE capability are supported on same terms as PAE-enabled ones. The only difference between the two Bodhi versions is that an older kernel is used.

Using an Enlightenment DR17-based fork called Moksha Desktop, Bodhi provides desktop effects and animations that do not require high end computer hardware. The project was forked from DR17 since later versions of Enlightenment had performance and stability issues. The Enlightenment window manager, as well as the tools developed specifically for Bodhi Linux, were written in the C programming language and Python.

Support 
Bodhi Linux is derived from the Ubuntu long term support releases (14.04, 16.04, 18.04...), so support follows the same pattern: Security bug fixes are released on a daily basis throughout the five-year period. As opposed to Ubuntu, Bodhi has no short-term support release. An installed Bodhi Linux can be upgraded to the latest state via command line or package manager.

Release cycle 
Releases are numbered x.y.z, where

 x represents a major release, 
 y represents an update (or point) release and 
 z represents a bug fix release.

The major release (x.y.z; e.g. version 2.y.z > 3.0.0) follows the Ubuntu long term support with a delay of a few months. The goal is to deliver a new major release in July every other year following the new Ubuntu LTS, which is expected in April. New functionality is not added after the release.

The update/point release (x.y.z; e.g. version 2.3.z > 2.4.0) is similar to point releases in Ubuntu (12.04.1, 12.04.2,...). Once more frequent, they are used for delivering new software versions and other improvements which are not related to security. Between 2011 and 2013 there was ARM support.

Beginning with version 2.4.0 update frequency was reduced to three times a year. Bodhi Linux 2.4.0 (originally planned for release in August 2013) appeared late in mid-September. A bug fix release (x.y.z; e.g. version 2.4.0 > 2.4.1) was released to fix configuration bugs.

The Bodhi Linux 3.0.0 branch was released in February 2015 with an additional "legacy" version for older hardware.

R_Pi Bodhi Linux
The R_Pi Bodhi Linux build was built directly on top of Raspbian and incorporates all of the changes and improvements to produce optimized ″hard float″ code for the Raspberry Pi (armhf or ARM HF). Technically, R_Pi Bodhi Linux is built with compilation settings adjusted to produce optimized ″hard float″ code for the Raspberry Pi (armhf or ARM HF). The hard float application binary interface of the ARM11, a 32-bit RISC microprocessor ARM architecture with ARMv6 architectural additions, provides enormous performance gains for many use cases. However, this requires significant effort to port elements of Debian Wheezy to be comparable with ARMv6 CPUs, as official builds require ARMv7. Because of the effort to build a working release, the ARMHF release is not officially supported anymore.

Reception 
Jack Germain from LinuxInsider wrote a positive review of Bodhi Linux 5.0.0, noting that Bodhi Linux is "elegant and lightweight", and that this distribution "can be a productive computing platform".

See also
 Enlightenment Foundation Libraries
 Enlightenment (window manager)
 Minimalism (computing)

References

External links 

 
 
 Bodhi Linux documentation/wiki
 Bodhi Linux at SourceForge.net

Linux distributions
Ubuntu derivatives
X86-64 Linux distributions